Deer Cave, located near Miri, Sarawak, Malaysia, is a show cave attraction of Gunung Mulu National Park. It was surveyed in 1961 by G. E. Wilford of the British Borneo Geological Survey, who predicted that Mulu would yield many more caves in the future. The cave, which is also known as Gua Payau or Gua Rusa by the local Penan and Berawan people, is said to have received its name because of the deer that go there to lick salt-bearing rocks and shelter themselves.

Description and survey history
The cave was extensively mapped by a Royal Geographical Society expedition in 1978. This survey, made by the Hoffman Institute at Western Kentucky University, revealed the maximum cross-sectional area to be in the large southern passage.

Geologic history

An explanation of the cave's formation is strongly interconnected with the geological history of the island of Borneo itself. The movement of the Asian and Australian tectonic plates caused the crust to buckle and elevate the land once more, giving birth to the island of Borneo and the Mulu mountains, around five million years ago. Since then, the landscape was hacked by constant erosion from precipitations and winds. 

The mountain’s surface is composed mostly of limestone, which dissolves when in contact with fresh water, and thus has been slowly sculpted into a karst. Rainwater also infiltrates the porous sedimentary rocks after going through the soil and progressively dissolves the limestone, widening the pores and cracks and creating caves of impressive dimensions such as the Deer Cave. This natural process, which is still working, will cause the cave to widen even more in the future.

Access and tourism

Tourism access to the cave (and to the entire park) was opened in 1984. The landscape attracts around 25,000 visitors from countries all over the world every year.

To access Deer Cave, one must first enter the Gunung Mulu National Park, by way of Kota Kinabalu or the nearby city of Miri. Malaysian Airlines operates flights of approximately 30 minutes from Miri to Mulu. The park can also be reached by boat from Marudi, but a special booking must be made since no regular boat covers that area.

Access to Deer Cave from the National Park entrance is via a  plank walkway which passes through regions of lowland and limestone tropical rainforest with immense trees and limestone outcrops. This walk is considered an additional attraction to visitors as it takes them through the rainforest (of about ) and by an ancient Penan Burial Cave.

Some artificial lighting is provided within the cave, but flashlights are recommended for personal use in darker areas. Visitor attention may be drawn to a specific formations - unique stalagmites and also to a specific formation near the cave entrance which bears a distinct resemblance to the profile of Abraham Lincoln.

The Garden of Eden is a karst valley or sinkhole with a volume of 150 million cubic meters, its bottom is covered with rainforest.

Fauna
In 2008, Prince Albert II of Monaco visited the Gunung Mulu National Park to launch a new camera system as part of the Bat Observatory, which is located near the entrance of the Deer Cave. Known as the Bat Cam, the surveillance technology allows visitors and scientists to observe approximately 3 million bats (over 30 species) that live inside the Deer Cave without affecting their habitat or habits, providing a valuable tool for the study of cave fauna. A viewing area has also been built outside, below the cave entrance, so that visitors can view the nightly "bat exodus" as they exit the cave and stream away in tight formation.

At least 12 bat species are found in Deer Cave.
Cave nectar bat (Eonycteris spelaea)
Greater sheath-tailed bat (Emballonura alecto)
Bornean horseshoe bat (Rhinolophus borneensis)
Philippine horseshoe bat (Rhinolophus philippinensis)
Cantor's roundleaf bat (Hipposideros galeritus)
Fawn roundleaf bat (Hipposideros cervinus)
Dayak roundleaf bat (Hipposideros dyacorum)
Diadem roundleaf bat (Hipposideros diadema)
Lesser tail-less roundleaf bat (Coelops robinsoni)
Lesser bentwing bat (Miniopterus australis)
Naked bat (Cheiromeles torquatus)
Free-tail or wrinkle-lipped bat (Chaerephon plicata)

Deer Cave derives its name from the sambar deer (Cervus unicolor), an uncommon species of deer native to Malaysia, which make their home largely in the immediate area of the cave. Additionally, many other animals such as the rhinoceros hornbill, bearded pig, sun bear, and gibbon are native to the local area.

Surroundings
Deer Cave was believed to be the largest cave passage in the world until the discovery of Sơn Đoòng cave in Phong Nha-Kẻ Bàng National Park in Vietnam in 2009. It is part of the Gunung Mulu National Park, a UNESCO World Heritage Site characterised by amazing caves and karst formations in a mountainous equatorial rainforest setting. 

It is recognised for its clear underground stream, popular with tourists. The Wind cave is located on the same trail leading to Clearwater cave, and is known for its blowing wind. It contains a chamber dubbed King’s Room, a cavern containing huge columns of stone on both the ceiling and the floor. The Lang cave is the smallest of the caves open to the public. However, its size allows up-close opportunities to see some of the common cave inhabitants such as bats and swiftlets.

References

External links

Caves of Sarawak
Show caves in Malaysia
Tourist attractions in Sarawak